Justin Marc San Buenaventura Chipeco (April 6, 1975), more commonly known as Timmy Chipeco, is a Filipino lawyer and politician who is the incumbent city mayor of Calamba, Laguna. He is also a former member of the House of Representatives of the Philippines, representing Laguna's 2nd District. He served this district for three consecutive terms, having first won in 2004, in 2007, and in 2010. He is the son of Joaquin Chipeco, Jr., the current legislative representative of the lone district of Calamba, He was defeated in an upset By Charisse Anne Hernandez in his run for Congressman of the Lone District of Calamba.

House of Representatives
Chipeco served as Representative, running under the banner of the Nacionalista Party. He defeated two independent candidates, Rosauro Revilla and Severino Vergara.

Chipeco is the Vice Chairperson of the Committee for Constitutional Amendments and a Member for the Majority of the Committees for Accounts, Banks and Financial Intermediaries, Housing and Urban Development, Public Works and Highways, and Southern Tagalog Development. He has authored 16 house measures and co-authored 31.

External links
 
 
 

21st-century Filipino lawyers
People from Calamba, Laguna
Arellano University alumni
1975 births
Timmy
Living people
Nacionalista Party politicians
Mayors of places in Laguna (province)
Members of the House of Representatives of the Philippines from Laguna (province)